Ivan Antolek (born 27 January 1993) is a Croatian football forward who plays for Ayia Napa.

Club career
He was in the NK Varteks (renamed NK Varaždin mid-2010) youth system, starting his professional career with the senior Varaždin club in 2012. He previously played for Gorica. He also had spells in the Austrian lower leagues with Bad Radkersburg and Schlaining  and in Iceland with Höttur/Huginn.

References

External links
PrvaLiga profile 

1993 births
Living people
Sportspeople from Čakovec
Association football forwards
Croatian footballers
NK Varaždin players
HNK Gorica players
NK Zavrč players
AEK Larnaca FC players
Ayia Napa FC players
Íþróttafélagið Höttur players
Croatian Football League players
Cypriot First Division players
Austrian Landesliga players
3. deild karla players
Croatian expatriate footballers
Croatian expatriate sportspeople in Cyprus
Expatriate footballers in Cyprus
Croatian expatriate sportspeople in Slovenia
Expatriate footballers in Slovenia
Expatriate footballers in Austria
Croatian expatriate sportspeople in Austria
Expatriate footballers in Iceland
Croatian expatriate sportspeople in Iceland